Henri Révoil (1822–1900) was a 19th-century French architect.

Biography

Early life
Henri Révoil was born in 1822 in Aix-en-Provence. His father was the painter Pierre Révoil.

Career
From 1855 to 1860, he designed the facade of the Église de la Madeleine, which is listed as a Monument historique. He also designed the lower part of the Fontaine du Roi René on the Cours Mirabeau in 1819; three years later, in 1822, David d'Angers (1788–1856) designed a statue of René of Anjou on top of it.

Additionally, he was commissioned to decorate the Marseille Cathedral in Marseille. He went on to restore many other churches in Provence.

Additionally, he restored the Château de Tarascon in Tarascon.

He was a member of the Académie de Nîmes.

Personal life
He was married to Louise-Anais-Henriette Baragnon (1830-1870). They resided in Nîmes. Their son, Paul Révoil (1856-1914), became a diplomat and nonfiction author.

He died in 1900 in Mouriès.

Bibliography
Henri Révoil, Architecture romane du midi de la France: Architecture civile (Morel, 1874, Volume 3, 43 pages)

References

1822 births
1900 deaths
People from Aix-en-Provence
19th-century French architects